The Tangevaerket Dam is an earth-fill embankment dam on the Gudenå River just east of the town of Tange in Viborg Municipality, Denmark. The primary purpose of the dam is hydroelectric power production and it supports a 3.3 MW power station which is the largest in the nation. The dam and power station were designed by Kristian Thomsen and S. A. Angelo in 1909. Construction did not begin until an agreement was reached with the Gudenå Commission. The power station was commissioned on 20 December 1920 and the reservoir flooded five homes and 22 farms. Its inauguration occurred on 8 January 1921. The dam is also equipped with a fish ladder.

The power station's original concession for power production was set for 80 years. The concession has since been prolonged several times. Last in 2015 where it was prolonged by another 30 years.

References

Dams in Denmark
Dams completed in 1921
Earth-filled dams
Hydroelectric power stations in Denmark
Energy infrastructure completed in 1921
1921 establishments in Denmark
Buildings and structures in Viborg Municipality
Dams with fish ladders